Milo Township can refer to any of a number of places in the United States.
Milo Township, Bureau County, Illinois
Milo Township, Delaware County, Iowa
Milo Township, Mille Lacs County, Minnesota
Milo, New York, a town in Yates County, New York